Opentrons is an open source liquid handling robot and can be used by life scientists to manipulate small volumes of liquids for the purpose of undertaking biochemical reactions. The instrument is used primarily by researchers and scientists interested in DIY biology but is increasingly being used by other biologists. They are produced by Opentrons Labworks.

Products  
 OT-1: The OpenTrons OT-1 was the result of a crowd funding campaign on the Kickstarter platform and was released in 2015 for $2,000. The release of the OT-1 marked the first commercial open source liquid handling robot in the life science industry.
 OT-2: The OpenTrons OT-2 was released in 2018 and has seen utilization as one of the open source tools that researchers are leveraging in the fight against COVID-19.

References 

Laboratory robots
Open-source robots